Progonia oileusalis is a moth of the family Noctuidae first described by Francis Walker in 1859. It is found in Sri Lanka, Borneo, India, Taiwan, Japan and the Philippines.

Gallery

References

Moths of Asia
Moths described in 1859
Herminiinae